Tapir is a pig-like animal. Tapir may also refer to 
Tapir 590 (born 1989), Peruvian Internet celebrity and entertainer.
Tapir Mountain Nature Reserve in Belize
HMS Tapir (P335), a World War II British submarine
Tapir Gao (born 1964), Indian politician